The Men's freestyle 97 kg is a competition featured at the 2017 European Wrestling Championships, and was held in Novi Sad, Serbia on May 3.

Medalists

 The winner of the silver medal in the 97 kg category, Anzor Boltukaev from Russia, was disqualified and deprived of the medal due to doping.

Results
Legend
F — Won by fall

Final

Top half

Section 1

Bottom half

Repechage

References

Draw
Results

Men's freestyle 97 kg